Laser powder forming, also known by the proprietary name (laser engineered net shaping) is an additive manufacturing technology developed for fabricating metal parts directly from a computer-aided design (CAD) solid model by using a metal powder injected into a molten pool created by a focused, high-powered laser beam. This technique is also equivalent to several trademarked techniques that have the monikers direct metal deposition (DMD), and laser consolidation (LC). Compared to processes that use powder beds, such as selective laser melting (SLM) objects created with this technology can be substantially larger, even up to several feet long.

Method
A high power laser is used to melt metal powder supplied coaxially to the focus of the laser beam through a deposition head. The laser beam typically travels through the center of the head and is focused to a small spot by one or more lenses. The X-Y table is moved in raster fashion to fabricate each layer of the object. The head is moved up vertically after each layer is completed. 

Metal powders are delivered and distributed around the circumference of the head either by gravity, or by using a pressurized carrier gas. An inert shroud gas is often used to shield the melt pool from atmospheric oxygen for better control of properties, and to promote layer to layer adhesion by providing better surface wetting.

Other techniques
This process is similar to other 3D fabrication technologies in its approach in that it forms a solid component by the layer additive method. The LENS process can go from metal and metal oxide powder to metal parts, in many cases without any secondary operations.  LENS is similar to selective laser sintering, but the metal powder is applied only where material is being added to the part at that moment. It can produce parts in a wide range of alloys, including titanium, stainless steel, aluminum, and other specialty materials; as well as composite and functionally graded materials. Primary applications for LENS technology include repair and overhaul, rapid prototyping, rapid manufacturing, and limited-run manufacturing for aerospace, defense, and medical markets. Microscopy studies show the LENS parts to be fully dense with no compositional degradation. Mechanical testing reveals outstanding as-fabricated mechanical properties.

The process can also make "near" net shape parts when it is not possible to make an item to exact specifications. In these cases post production process like light machining, surface finishing, or heat treatment may be applied to achieve end compliance. It is used as finishing operations.

References

External links 
Sandia National Laboratory LENS article. 

3D printing processes
Laser applications